Life Sentence to Love is an album by the American punk rock band Legal Weapon, released in 1988 on MCA Records.

Critical reception
Trouser Press gave the album a poor review, calling it "a keyboard-laden cross between Heart and the Cult over which [Kat] Arthur tries to emote."

Track listing

Personnel
Legal Weapon
Kat Arthur – vocals
Brian Hansen – guitar, vocals
Adam Maples – drums, vocals
Eddie Wayne – bass guitar, vocals

Additional musicians and production
Robert Blakeman – photography
Bob Carlyle – additional vocals
Ronnie Champagne – recording
Mark Ettel – recording
Jeff Eyrich – production on "SK8 (Skateboard)"
Tommy Funderburk – additional vocals
Andy Harper – mixing
Dave Jerden – production, engineering, mixing
John Kosh – design, art direction
Bob Ludwig – mastering
Craig Ross – guitar

References

1988 albums
Albums produced by Dave Jerden
Legal Weapon albums
MCA Records albums
Albums produced by Jeff Eyrich